King Zhou was the pejorative posthumous name given to Di Xin of Shang or King Shou of Shang, the last king of the Shang dynasty of ancient China. He is also called Zhou Xin. In Chinese, his name Zhòu (紂) also refers to a horse crupper, the part of a saddle or harness that is most likely to be soiled by the horse. It is not to be confused with the name of the succeeding dynasty which has a different character and pronunciation.

Early reign
In the Records of the Grand Historian, Sima Qian wrote that Di Xin, in the early part of his reign, had abilities which surpassed those of the ordinary man, and was quick-witted and quick-tempered. According to legend, he was intelligent enough to win all of his arguments, and he was strong enough to hunt wild beasts with his bare hands. He was the younger brother of Zi Qi (子啓) and Zi Yan (子衍) (later rulers of Zhou's vassal state Song) and father of Wu Geng. His father Di Yi had two brothers, Ji Zi and Bi Gan. Di Xin added to the territory of Shang by battling the tribes surrounding it, including the Dongyi to the east.

Late reign
A significant amount of information regarding Di Xin's life had been falsified by following dynasties. Thus many modern day historians believe that he was in fact reasonable and intelligent without several of the cruelties attributed to him. The following are accounts of him written in records published in the millennium following his death, during which many misconceptions surrounding him arose.
 
In his later years, Di Xin gave himself over to drinking, women and abandoned morals, preferring these to the proper governance of the country, and ignored almost all affairs of state. According to Sima Qian, he even hosted festive orgies where many people engaged in immoral things at the same time with his concubines and created songs with crude (erotic) lyrics and poor rhythm. In legends, he is depicted as having come under the influence of his wicked wife Daji, and committing all manner of evil and cruel deeds with her.  In fictionalizations, including the novel Fengshen Yanyi, she was said to be possessed by a malevolent fox spirit.

One of the most famous forms of entertainment Zhou enjoyed was the "Alcohol Pool and Meat Forest".  A large pool, big enough for several canoes, was constructed on the Palace grounds, with inner linings of polished oval shaped stones from the seashores.  This allowed for the entire pool to be filled with alcohol.  A small island was constructed in the middle of the pool, where trees were planted, which had branches made of roasted meat skewers hanging over the pool.  This allowed Zhou and his friends and concubines to drift on canoes in the pool.  When they thirsted, they reached down into the pool with their hands and drank the wine.  When they hungered, they reached up with their hands to eat the roasted meat.  This was considered one of the most famous examples of decadence and corruption of a ruler in Chinese history.

According to the Records of the Grand Historian, in order to please Daji, he  created the "Punishment of burning flesh with a hot iron(炮格之刑)".  One large hollow bronze cylinder was stuffed with burning charcoal and allowed to burn until red-hot; then prisoners were made to hug the cylinder, which resulted in a painful and unsightly death.

Zhou and Daji were known to get highly aroused after watching such torture.  Victims ranged from ordinary people and prisoners to high government officials, such as Mei Bo.

In order to fund Zhou's heavy daily expenses, heavy taxes were implemented.  The people suffered greatly, and lost all hope for the Shang dynasty.  Zhou's brother Wei Zi tried to persuade him to change, but was rebuked. His uncle Bi Gan similarly remonstrated with him, but Di Xin had his heart ripped out so he could see what the heart of a sage looked like. When his other uncle Ji Zi heard this, he went to remonstrate with the kingly nephew and, feigning madness, was imprisoned.

Fall
When Zhou dynasty's army, led by Jiang Ziya, defeated the Shang dynasty at the Battle of Muye in 1046 BC, Di Xin gathered all his treasures around himself in the Palace, and then set fire to his palace and committed suicide. After his death, Di Xin's head was cut off and displayed on a white-flag pole by Ji Fa. Of Di Xin's favorite consorts, Da Ji was executed and two more committed suicide, and their heads likewise were displayed on either small white flag poles or red flag poles.

The name Zhòu (紂; crupper) actually appeared after the death of King Zhou, a posthumous name (although perhaps used furtively by his contemporaries). This name was a representation of his actions, both dishonorable and cold-hearted. King Zhou would go down in history as one of the worst examples of a corrupted king in China.

Mentions in literature and legend
Zhou is mentioned in the Confucian Analects (19 "子張"); and also in the Three Character Classic. Zhou is also one of the main subjects of Fengshen Yanyi (Investiture of the Gods) and its various derivations in popular media. Thus, Di Xin, also known as Zhou, has served as a (negative) exemplar of Confucian principles (presented as the wicked ruler who justifies regime change according to the Mandate of Heaven), as well as becoming an icon of popular culture. This makes for a biographically interesting figure, but one challenging a clear distinction between history, legend, and philosophical point-making.

In Fengshen Yanyi, Zhou visited the Goddess Nüwa's temple and offended the Goddess with his lustful comments towards her beauty. In response, Nüwa decided that the Shang dynasty should end and sent her three subordinates to become three beautiful women (including Daji) to bewitch Zhou. Under the influence of these women, Zhou becomes a ruthless king, losing the support of people and triggering his downfall. Until now, nobody knows most of his lifestyle from the reduced amount of artifacts found regarding to him.

According to the Fengshen Yanyi, Jiang Ziya recognized that King Zhou was a well-versed and well-trained individual who became an incapable ruler only because of having fallen victim to seduction. After his death, Jiang Ziya deified King Zhou as the Tianxi Xing (天喜星 "Star of Heavenly Happiness"). As the Tianxi Xing, he had the responsibility of managing the marriage affairs of humans.

Notes

References
Wu, K. C. (1982). The Chinese Heritage. New York: Crown Publishers. .

Further reading
 

Shang dynasty kings
Suicides in China
Suicides by self-immolation
1046 BC deaths
Chinese gods
Deified Chinese people
Investiture of the Gods characters
Year of birth unknown
11th-century BC Chinese monarchs
Ancient people who committed suicide